Death sticks or Deathstick may refer to:

 A slang term for cigarettes
 A brand of framing hammer
 The Elder Wand, a fictional, powerful magical artifact in the Harry Potter universe